Koenigsmark is a 1923 French silent drama film directed by Léonce Perret and starring Maurice Lehmann, Huguette Duflos and Jaque Catelain. It is an adaptation of the 1918 novel Koenigsmark by Pierre Benoit. It was the first of several screen adaptations of the work. It is also known by the alternative title of The Secret Spring.

In 1926 it was released in the United States by Paramount Pictures.

Cast
 Maurice Lehmann as Philippe de Koenigsmark 
 Huguette Duflos as Grande-duchesse Aurore de Lautenbourg  
 Jaque Catelain as Professeur Raoul Vignerte  
 Georges Vaultier as Grand-duc Frédéric de Lautenbourg  
 André Liabel as Baron de Boose  
 Iván Petrovich as Lieutenant de Hagen  
 Julio de Romero as Prince Tumène  
 Paul Vermoyal as Cyrus Beck 
 Karl Heyl as Roi Stephen II  
 Jean Aymé as Monsieur de Marsais  
 C. Farnet as Ribeyre  
 Clara Tambour as Totoche  
 Diana Kotchaki as Comtesse de Platen  
 A. Debriège as Natacha  
 Jean Fleury as Prince Joachim  
 Robert Guilbert as De Kessel  
 Laurent Morléas as Monsieur de Bernhardt  
 Fernand Mailly as Monsieur de Choisly 
 Philippe Rolla as Monsieur de Wendel  
 Henry Houry as Grand-duc Rodolphe de Lautenbourg  
 Marcya Capri as Mélusine de Graffenfried  
 Pierre de Canolle as Lieutenant allemand  
 Renée Sylvaire as Nini  
 Suzanne Valrose as Sophie-Dorothée 
 Jules de Spoly

References

Bibliography
 Goble, Alan. The Complete Index to Literary Sources in Film. Walter de Gruyter, 1999.

External links 
 

1923 films
1923 drama films
French drama films
French silent feature films
1920s French-language films
Films directed by Léonce Perret
Films based on French novels
Films based on works by Pierre Benoit
Films set in Germany
Films set in the 1910s
French black-and-white films
Silent drama films
1920s French films
Pathé films